Lake Oscar is a lake in Otter Tail County, in the U.S. state of Minnesota.

Lake Oscar was named for Oscar II of Sweden.

See also
List of lakes in Minnesota

References

Lakes of Otter Tail County, Minnesota
Lakes of Minnesota